Kim Chae-yeon (born December 4, 2004), better known mononymously as Chaeyeon, is a South Korean singer and actress. She is currently a member of tripleS, a girl group under MODHAUS. She is also a former member of the South Korean group CutieL and Busters as the vocalist. Kim began her acting career in 2008 in a South Korean film, Scandal Makers.

Career

2010–2020: Early career beginnings, CutieL, debut with Busters

Kim began her acting career in 2008 in a supporting role in a South Korean film, Scandal Makers.

In 2014, Chaeyeon became a member of the children's group 'CutieL' as a 2nd generation member. In 2017, all 2nd generation members departed from the group. 

She was announced to be a member of Busters when they were formed to promote Monstergram's upcoming TV series Idol Rangers Power Busters. She made her debut with the group's single album Dream On on November 27, 2017, She didn't participate in the Paeonia comeback due to conflicting schedules caused by her MC position on 'Boni Hani'. On August 6, 2020, Chaeyeon left the group to continue acting and other activities.

2022–present: tripleS
On June 16, 2022, it was reported that Chae-yeon would be re-debuting as a member of tripleS. On June 22, 2022, Chae-yeon was introduced as the fourth member of tripleS.

In July 2022, Chae-yeon sung the original sound track for the animation series Armored Saurus Season 2. 

On February 13 2023, Chae-yeon, alongside Kim Yoo-yeon, Kim Na-kyoung, Seo Da-hyun, Yoon Seo-yeon, Gong Yu-bin, Lee Ji-woo, Kaede, Jeong Hye-rin, and Kim Soo-min, released TripleS' debut EP, Assemble, with the title track "Rising", as a 10-member unit.

Endorsements
Kim has appeared in commercials for PENGTALK, Perfect Score Math Plus, Knights Chronicles and GS25. In 2019, She collaborated with Academy Sciences, launching a toy product called 'Creating a Creator' for children who want to be a one-man creator.

Discography

Soundtrack appearance

Filmography

Film

Television series

Hosting

References 

2004 births
Living people
People from Seoul
Musicians from Seoul
South Korean female idols
K-pop singers
South Korean women pop singers
South Korean dance music singers
21st-century South Korean women singers
South Korean child actresses
South Korean television actresses